The Heilbronn Hills in the borough of Heilbronn with foothills in the county of Heilbronn are the northwestern outliers of the Lowenstein Hills in the south German state of Baden-Württemberg and reach a height of . Together with the Sulm Plateau to the northeast they are often known as the Heilbronn Uplands (Heilbronner Bergland).

Geography

Location 
The Heilbronn Hills forms the northwestern foothills of the Löwenstein Hills in the west-northwestern part of the Swabian-Franconian Forest. The region extends from north to south, bulging eastwards in a sickle-shape around the city of Heilbronn. In the north and northeast it is bounded by the valley of Weinsberger Tal on the far side of which is the Sulm Plateau. To the east on the other side of the valley of the Stadtseebach (Saubach) are the west-northwest foothills of the Mainhardt Forest, to the southeast the range transitions into the Lowenstein Hills themselves and in the southwest, west and northwest they descend in keuper escarpments into the Neckar Basin.

Villages dot the edges of the Heilbronn Hills, many, especially those in the borough of Heilbronn, extending into the hills: Erlenbach and Weinsberg in the north, Lehrensteinsfeld (further away) in the east, Obergruppenbach in the southeast, Untergruppenbach in the south, Flein and Sontheim in the southwest, Heilbronn in the west and Neckarsulm in the northwest.

Natural regions 
From a natural region perspective, the Heilbronn Hills (No. 108.13) with the Weinsberger Tal (108.12) and the Sulmer Bergebene (108.11) are part of the Lowenstein Hills (108.1) within the Swabian Keuper-Lias Plains (10) and Swabian-Franconian Forest (108).

Hills 
The high points of the Heilbronn Hills included the following – sorted by height in metres (m) above sea level (NHN; unless otherwise stated according to the ):
 Reisberg (378.0 m), 1.5 km north-northeast of the Heilbronn village of Obergruppenbach
 Schweinsberg (372.8 m), 1.5 km northwest of the Heilbronn village of Donnbronn
 Hintersberg (364.5 m), 1.6 km northwest of Obergruppenbach
 Dornberg (344.5 m), 0.8 km northwest of Obergruppenbach
 Wartberg (313.3 m), 2.3 km northeast of Heilbronn's city centre
 Galgenberg (ca. 312 m), 3.8 km east of Heilbronn's city centre
 Staufenberg (300.7 m), 1.5 km northeast of the Heilbronn village of Flein
 Büchelberg (293.0 m), 3.5 km southeast of Heilbronn's city centre
 Gaffenberg (278.1 m), ca. 3 km southeast of Heilbronn's city centre
 Stiftsberg (255.4 m), ca. 3 km north-northeast of Heilbronn's city centre
 Hagelsberg (265.5 m), 1 km north-northeast of Flein

References 

Regions of Baden-Württemberg
Forests and woodlands of Baden-Württemberg
Natural regions of the Swabian Keuper-Lias Plains
Heilbronn